The Fremont Hub is a regional outdoor shopping center in Fremont, California, United States, in the San Francisco Bay Area. It is located on Mowry Avenue in the city's Central District. The shopping center is anchored by Target, and it also includes major retailers such as Bed Bath & Beyond, Party City, Marshalls, Ross Dress for Less, Safeway and Trader Joe's.

The shopping center formerly had a movie theater called "GCC Fremont Hub 8 Cinemas," which opened in 1986, then closed in October 2004 after going out of business in 2003.

References

External links
 Official Website

Shopping malls in the San Francisco Bay Area